Malombra is a 1917 silent Italian drama film directed by Carmine Gallone. The film was shown as part of the Silent Divas of the Italian Cinema programme at the 38th New York Film Festival in 2000. It is an adaptation of the 1881 novel Malombra by Antonio Fogazzaro, which was later adapted into a 1942 film of the same name.

Plot
Marina di Malombra (Borelli) lives in a castle prior to her wedding. She begins to read letters written by an ancestor called Cecilia. She finds out that Cecilia was driven to her death by her uncle. Marina identifies with Cecilia and take revenge on her behalf by murdering her uncle. After she has done this, Marina commits suicide.

Cast
 Lyda Borelli as Marina di Malombra
 Amleto Novelli as Corrado Silla
 Augusto Mastripietri as Cesare d'Ormegno
 Amedeo Ciaffi as Steinegge
 Francesco Cacace as Conte Salvador
 Consuelo Spada as Edith Steinegge
 Giulia Cassini-Rizzotto as Contessa Salvador

References

External links
 

1917 films
1917 drama films
Italian drama films
Italian silent feature films
Italian black-and-white films
Films directed by Carmine Gallone
Silent drama films
Films based on Italian novels